is a Japanese football player currently playing for Tochigi SC and currently assistant managers club WE League of MyNavi Sendai.

Club career statistics
Updated to 23 February 2016.

FIFA Club World Cup career statistics

Team honors
AFC Champions League - 2008
Pan-Pacific Championship - 2008
Emperor's Cup - 2008, 2009

References

External links

Profile at Tochigi SC

1982 births
Living people
Osaka Gakuin University alumni
People from Shiogama, Miyagi
Association football people from Miyagi Prefecture
Japanese footballers
J1 League players
J2 League players
J3 League players
Montedio Yamagata players
Gamba Osaka players
Vegalta Sendai players
Kyoto Sanga FC players
Tochigi SC players
Association football midfielders